Daniel D. Fernández (June 30, 1944 – February 18, 1966) was a United States Army soldier in the Vietnam War who received the U.S. military's highest decoration, the Medal of Honor. Fernández was awarded the medal for his actions in Hậu Nghĩa province, Republic of Vietnam, in February 1966 — throwing himself on a live grenade, he sacrificed his life to save lives of the soldiers around him.

Early years
Born in Albuquerque, New Mexico, on June 30, 1944, Fernández grew up in nearby Los Lunas. He had two younger brothers, Peter and James, and a sister Rita.

Fernández joined the Army from Albuquerque in 1962 and by 1966 was on his second tour of duty in Vietnam. During that deployment, he served as a specialist four in Company C, 1st Battalion, 5th Infantry Regiment (Mechanized), 25th Infantry Division. On February 18, 1966, in Củ Chi, Hậu Nghĩa province, his 16-man patrol was ambushed by a Viet Cong rifle company and forced to fall back. Fernández and two others volunteered to follow a sergeant back to the ambush site and rescue a wounded soldier who had been left behind. After reaching the injured man, the sergeant was shot in the knee and Fernández took over command of the patrol. All five men were pinned down by heavy fire when a rifle grenade landed in their midst. In the scramble to get away from the device, Fernández accidentally kicked it closer to the rest of the group. He then shouted "move out", jumped over the immobile sergeant, and threw himself on the grenade. He was killed in the resulting explosion, but successfully saved the lives of his fellow soldiers.

For this action, Fernández was posthumously awarded the Medal of Honor in November 1966. He was the first of nine Mexican Americans to receive the medal in Vietnam.

Medal of Honor
His official Medal of Honor citation reads:

A Requiem Mass was held for Fernández at Los Lunas High School prior to his burial at Santa Fe National Cemetery. His name is inscribed on the Vietnam Veterans Memorial ("The Wall") on Panel 05E, Row 046.

Honors
In Fernández's hometown of Los Lunas, a number of structures have been named in his honor. In March 1966, the newly opened Los Lunas Junior High School was renamed Daniel Fernández Junior High School in his honor. It has since been reorganized as Daniel D. Fernández Intermediate School. A park and recreation facility, Daniel D. Fernández Memorial Park, was dedicated in 1972. The local Veterans of Foreign Wars post bears his name, as does a road, Fernandez Street.

Students at Daniel D. Fernández Intermediate School wrote of biography of him, titled Man of Honor: The Story of Daniel D. Fernández, which was published in 2009 by Author House Publishing.

See also

List of Medal of Honor recipients for the Vietnam War
List of Hispanic Medal of Honor recipients

References

External links 
 Daniel Fernández, Medal of Honor at mishalov.com
 SP4 Daniel Fernandez by Rattler/Firebird Association

1944 births
1966 deaths
People from Los Lunas, New Mexico
United States Army soldiers
American military personnel killed in the Vietnam War
United States Army Medal of Honor recipients
Vietnam War recipients of the Medal of Honor
Deaths by hand grenade
United States Army personnel of the Vietnam War
Burials at Santa Fe National Cemetery